The Armstrong Siddeley Viper is a British turbojet engine developed and produced by Armstrong Siddeley and then by its successor companies Bristol Siddeley and Rolls-Royce Limited. It entered service in 1953 and remained in use with the Royal Air Force, powering its Dominie T1 navigation training aircraft until January 2011.

Design and development
The design originally featured a seven-stage compressor based on their Adder engine — the Viper is in effect a large-scale Adder.

Like the similar J85 built in United States, the Viper was originally developed as an expendable engine for production versions of the Jindivik target drone. Like the J85, the limited-life components and total-loss oil systems were replaced with standard systems for use in crewed aircraft.

Because it was initially developed as an expendable engine, the Viper was subject to many recurring maintenance issues. This led to the development of the first Power by the Hour program in which operators would pay a fixed hourly rate to Bristol Siddeley for the continual maintenance of the engines.

In the 1970s, Turbomecanica Bucharest and Orao Sarajevo acquired the license for the Viper engine, which propelled various Romanian and Yugoslav built aircraft.

Variants

Data from:Jane's All the World's Aircraft 1955-56, Jane's all the World's Aircraft 1959-60, Jane's All the World's Aircraft 1962-63
ASV.1Short life design study; .
ASV.2Developed short life version, first run in April 1951; .
ASV.3 (Mk.100) Short life for missile/target applications, flight-tested in the tail of an Avro Lancaster November 1952; .
ASV.4Short life for missile/target applications first run in 1952, .
ASV.5(Mk. 101) Extended life version for crewed aircraft.
ASV.6Short life for missile/target applications; .
ASV.7
ASV.7/R ASV.7 with re-heat;.
ASV.9 (became Viper 9 and Mk.103) Similar to ASV.8 with improved turbine materials; .
ASV.10Long-life version with re-designed Sapphire-style compressor first run in January 1956; .
ASV.11 (became Viper 11 and Mk.200) ASV.10 with increased mass-flow; .
ASV.12 (became Viper 12) up-rated ASV.11 with higher JPT and rated at 
Viper 8 (Mk.102 / Mk.104): Engines for the Hunting-Percival Jet Provost TMk.3 (Mk.102) and GAF Jindivik Mk.102B target drone (Mk.104).
Viper 9 (Mk.103): Powered the Bell X-14 and Handley Page HP 115 among others.
Viper 11 (Mk.200): Powered the Hunting-Percival Jet Provost TMk.4(Mk202) and GAF Jindivik Mk.3 among others.
Viper 12 see ASV.12 above
Viper 20 (Mk.500 series): Powered the Hawker Siddeley HS.125 and Piaggio-Douglas PD.808 among others.
Viper 22 Built under licence by Piaggio for the Aermacchi MB.326
Mk.100 see ASV.3 above
Mk.101 see ASV.5 above
Mk.102 see ASV.8 above
Mk.103 see ASV.9 and Viper 9 above
Mk.104 see ASV.12 above
Mk.200
Mk.201
Mk.202
Mk.204 
Mk.301
Mk.521
Mk.522
Mk.525
Mk.601
Mk.632 Built under licence by Turbomecanica and Orao, as the non-afterburning engine for the IAR-93 Vultur A/MB versions, Soko J-22 Orao 1 version, IAR-99 Standard/Șoim versions, and Soko G-4 Super Galeb.
Mk.633 Built under licence by Turbomecanica and Orao, as the afterburning engine for the IAR-93 Vultur B version, and Soko J-22 Orao 2 version.
M.D.30 ViperEngines licence-built and developed by Dassault Aviation
M.D.30R Viper with afterburner.

Applications

Specifications (Viper ASV.12)

See also

References

Notes

Bibliography

 Gunston, Bill. World Encyclopedia of Aero Engines. Cambridge, England. Patrick Stephens Limited, 1989. 
 Smith, Tom. "Expendable to Indispensable: The Story of a Classic Turbojet - The Viper". Air Enthusiast, No. 55, Autumn 1994, pp. 37–55.

External links

 Rolls-Royce - Viper

Viper
Viper
Viper
1950s turbojet engines